Edgar Stahmer (1911–1996) was a German music educator, most known for popularising the bowed psaltery, which he developed in the 1930s for music education in German schools. The instrument had earlier been patented by Clemens Neuber in 1925.

References

German music educators
German luthiers
1911 births
1996 deaths